Belarusian Canadians are Canadian citizens of Belarusian descent or Belarusian-born individuals who reside in Canada. According to the 2016 Census there were 20,710  Canadians who claimed Belarusian ancestry.

Vincent Žuk-Hryškievič estimated the number of Belarusians in Canada in late 1959 at about 40 thousands, with a majority of Russian Empire era Belarusian immigrants being listed as Russians or Poles because Belarusians were not present as a separate category in Canadian documents.

The oldest Belarusian diaspora organization in Canada, Belarusian Canadian Alliance, was established by Kastus Akula in 1948 in Toronto.

Notable individuals
 Kastuś Akuła
 Valery Fabrikant
 Albert Gretzky
 Walter Gretzky
 Wayne Gretzky
 David Lewis
 Barys Rahula
 Ivonka Survilla
 Vincent Žuk-Hryškievič
 Don Tapscott

References 

Ethnic groups in Canada

European Canadian
Canada